Clytus is a genus of longhorn beetles in the family Cerambycidae.

Species

Clytus ambigenus Chevrolat, 1882
Clytus angustefasciatus Pic, 1943
Clytus arietis (Linnaeus, 1758)
Clytus arietoides Reitter, 1900
Clytus auripilis Bates, 1884
Clytus balwanti Gardner, 1942
Clytus bellus Holzschuh, 1998
Clytus blaisdelli Van Dyke, 1920
Clytus buglanicus Kadlec, 2005
Clytus canadensis Hopping, 1928
Clytus ceylonicus Gardner, 1939
Clytus chemsaki Hovore & Giesbert, 1974
Clytus chiangmaiensis Viktora, 2019
Clytus ciliciensis (Chevrolat, 1863)
Clytus clavicornis Reiche, 1860
Clytus clitellarius (Van Dyke, 1920)
Clytus depilis Holzschuh, 2019
Clytus dongziensis Viktora, 2020
Clytus famosus Viktora & Liu, 2018
Clytus fibularis Holzschuh, 2003
Clytus fulvohirsutus Pic, 1904
Clytus gulekanus Pic, 1904
Clytus incanus Newman, 1842
Clytus kabateki Sama, 1997
Clytus kumalariensis Johanides, 2001
Clytus lama Mulsant, 1850
Clytus larvatus Gressitt, 1939
Clytus madoni Pic, 1890
Clytus marginicollis Laporte & Gory, 1841
Clytus mayeti Théry, 1892
Clytus melaenus Bates, 1884
Clytus minutissimus Nonfried, 1894
Clytus minutus Gardner, 1939
Clytus montesuma Laporte & Gory, 1841
Clytus nigritulus Kraatz, 1879
Clytus orientalis Kano, 1933
Clytus pacificus (Van Dyke, 1920)
Clytus paradisiacus Rapuzzi & Jeniš, 2015
Clytus parvigranulatus Holzschuh, 2006
Clytus peyroni Pic, 1899
Clytus planifrons (LeConte, 1874)
Clytus qingmaiensis Viktora, 2020
Clytus quadraticollis Ganglbauer, 1889
Clytus raddensis Pic, 1904
Clytus rhamni Germar, 1817
Clytus rufoapicalis Pic, 1917
Clytus rufobasalis Pic, 1917
Clytus ruricola (Olivier, 1800)
Clytus schneideri inapicalis Pic, 1895
Clytus schneideri Kiesenwetter, 1879
Clytus schurmanni Sama, 1996
Clytus signifer Marseul, 1875
Clytus simulator Nonfried, 1894
Clytus solitarius Pascoe, 1869
Clytus taurusiensis Pic, 1903
Clytus triangulimacula Costa, 1847
Clytus trifolionotatus Gressitt & Rondon, 1970
Clytus tropicus (Panzer, 1795)
Clytus unicolor (Kano, 1933)
Clytus validus Fairmaire, 1896
Clytus viridescens Matsushita, 1933

Species of uncertain placement (incertae sedis)
Clytus carinatus Laporte & Gory, 1841
†Clytus pervetustus (Cockerell, 1920) (fossil)
Clytus punctulatus Donovan, 1805
Clytus sexmaculatus Donovan, 1805

References 

 Özdikmen, H.; Turgut, S. 2009: A synopsis of Turkish Clytus Laicharting, 1784 and Sphegoclytus Sama, 2005 with zoogeographical remarks (Coleoptera: Cerambycidae: Cerambycinae). Munis entomology & zoology, 4: 353–370.

External links 
 
 
 
 Clytus at insectoid.info
 Clytus - Hippolyte Louis Gory - 'Des Insectes Coleopteres'

Clytini
Cerambycidae genera
Taxa named by Johann Nepomuk von Laicharting